Merritt Island is a peninsula, commonly referred to as an island, in Brevard County, Florida, United States, located on the eastern Floridian coast, along the Atlantic Ocean.  It is also the name of an unincorporated town in the central and southern parts of the island and a census-designated place (CDP).

The population was 34,518 at the 2020 census. It is part of the Palm Bay – Melbourne – Titusville, Florida Metropolitan Statistical Area. 

NASA's John F. Kennedy Space Center is located on Merritt Island to the north of the town, and Merritt Island National Wildlife Refuge is located north of the space center. 

The central part of Merritt Island, previously known as Merritt City, is home to the majority of the population and includes the local high school, library, and shopping district.  The southern area is heavily residential, with centralized light commercial and light industrial areas.

History

Etymology 
Merritt Island owes its name to the King of Spain. The entire island was part of a land grant given by the King to a nobleman named Merritt.

Pre-Columbian 
Archaeological excavations have uncovered the fossils of extinct animals such as mastodons, giant land tortoise, camel, glyptodont, horse, mammoth, giant armadillo, peccary, and tapir, which lived in the area up to 11,000 years ago. Their extinction was part of a larger North American die-off in which native horses, mastodons and other camelidaes also died out. Possibilities for extinction include global climate change and hunting pressure from the arrival of the Clovis people, who were prolific hunters with distinct fluted stone tools which allowed for a spear to be attached to the stone tool. This megafaunal extinction coincided roughly with the appearance of the big game hunting Clovis culture, and biochemical analyses have shown that Clovis tools were used in hunting camels.

By at least 800 to 900 BC, permanent Native American structures occupied the area. Their mounds populated the lagoon margin.

Post-Columbian 
In 1605, Spanish explorer Álvaro Mexía visited while on a diplomatic mission to the local tribes living in the Indian River area. He called the local tribe of Ais people, part of the native province of Ulumay. Merritt Island is the prominent island on a color map he drew of the area, a copy of which is in the archives at the Library of Congress and the archives in Seville, Spain. Within a few years, all but a handful of these natives were dead from an epidemic that plagued the area after the arrival of a shipwrecked British merchant.

In the 1760s, the Elliott Plantation grew sugar and milled it. Remains of the plantation can be found in the Wildlife Refuge. In April 1788, French botanist André Michaux traveled in Merritt Island, near Cape Canaveral. He spent five days looking for plants. He wrote a letter on April 24, 1788, from St Augustine. He reported discovering the flag or bigflower paw-paw, Asimina obovata (Annona grandiflora (Bartr.)). 

In 1837, Fort Ann was constructed on the east coast of Merritt Island near the present day Haulover Canal, to protect the area against the Seminoles. Merritt Island's recent history dates back to the mid-19th century and centers on the growth of citrus, stressing the cultivation of pineapples and oranges. The Indian River oranges and grapefruit come from this sandy area. Freezes destroyed the local pineapple industry in the late 1890s. Freed slaves constructed small towns in the area after the Civil War, including Haulover, Clifton, and Shiloh.

The island's population grew in the 1950s and 1960s as the Space Race began and nearby NASA expanded. Construction of a barge canal to the Intracoastal Waterway from the Atlantic Ocean (for power plant oil shipments) cut off the northern half of the island for many years. To this day, the northern portion of the island remains slightly less developed, with a few areas remaining as cattle pasture or citrus land. The small towns on the island vanished with the coming of the Space Age, and now only live on in the names of streets and historic churches. In 1988, citizens defeated a proposed incorporation into a city, 77% opposed to 23% in favor.

Sea Ray Boats operated a factory on Merritt Island from 1978 to 2012. At one time it employed 1200 people. It closed the plant in 2013.

Geography 

It connects to the Florida mainland where SR 3 now intersects US 1 in Volusia County. To the west  it is separated from the mainland by the Indian River and the Atlantic Intracoastal Waterway. To the east it is separated by the Mosquito Lagoon and the Banana River from the barrier island on which Cape Canaveral and Cocoa Beach stand. The east side of Merritt Island splits and is divided by Sykes Creek and Newfound Harbor. 

In the north, the Haulover Canal, first dug in the 19th century, separates the island from the mainland. To the west, the island is connected by causeways to mainland Brevard County near Titusville and Cocoa on its northern end, and in Melbourne on its southern end.  To the east the island is connected to Cape Canaveral by the Crawlerway, and by causeways to Cocoa Beach and Satellite Beach.

Fauna 
To the north, Merritt Island National Wildlife Refuge, along with a narrow barrier island that make up Canaveral National Seashore, offer an unpopulated protected buffer area for rocket launches at Kennedy Space Center. There are about 356 species of birds on the peninsula, one of the most diverse in the country. Migratory birds join the more resident wildlife, including alligators, manatees, dolphins, sea turtles, bald eagles, ospreys, bobcats, and the elusive Florida panther. A number of bald eagle nests are monitored atop power line poles along SR 3 within Kennedy Space Center.

There are about 12,000 feral pigs in North Merritt Island. Licensed trappers catch about 2,000 annually, which keeps the population even. The United States Fish and Wildlife Service would like to reduce the population.

Places on Merritt Island 
Merritt Island has or had 23 named communities, all unincorporated, including:

Demographics 

As of the census of 2000, there were 36,090 people, 14,955 households, and 10,049 families residing in the CDP. The racial makeup of the CDP was 90.22% White, 5.31% African American, 0.41% Native American, 1.65% Asian, 0.06% Pacific Islander, 0.68% from other races, and 1.66% from two or more races. Hispanic or Latino of any race were 3.83% of the population.

There were 14,955 households, out of which 27.1% had children under the age of 18, 52.9% were married couples living together, 10.7% had a female householder with no husband, and 32.8% were non-families. 26.8% of households were solely individuals and 11.4% had a lone resident of 65 or older. The average household size was 2.36 and the average family size was 2.86.

In the CDP, the population was spread out, with 21.8% under the age of 18, 6.1% from 18 to 24, 26.1% from 25 to 44, 26.2% from 45 to 64, and 19.8% of 65 or older. The median age was 43 years. For every 100 females, there were 95.3 males. For every 100 females age 18 and over, there were 92.3 males.

Government 
Merritt Island is under the administrative care of the local county government, with water being handled by the neighboring city of Cocoa. The county maintains operations for the sheriff's office, fire department, emergency medical services, and sewage systems.

Economy

Personal income 
According to the 2000 Census:
 Median household income   = $43,532
 Median family income      = $52,388
 Median income for males   = $41,393
 Median income for females = $25,787
 Per capita income     = $23,961
 Below the poverty line:
 Families                 = 7.2%
 Population               = 9.4%
 Those under age 18       = 13.8%
 Those over age 64        = 7.0%

Industry 
There are light industrial fabrication centers on the Merritt Island Airport, and NASA-related industrial activities to support the Space Shuttle, which was retired in summer of 2011, and other rocket launches on Cape Canaveral Space Force Station.

Air Liquide operates a plant there.

Redevelopment 
Merritt Island has a redevelopment agency funded by the county.

Education 
Merritt Island has several schools.

Public schools are operated by Brevard Public Schools:
 MILA Elementary
 Tropical Elementary
 Audubon Elementary
 Robert Louis Stevenson School of the Arts
 Lewis Carroll Elementary
 Gardendale Elementary  (Closed since 2014)
 Thomas Jefferson Middle School
 Edgewood Junior/Senior High School
 Merritt Island High School

Private schools:
 Merritt Island Christian
 Calvary Chapel Christian School

Library district 
The Merritt Island Public Library, though a part of the Brevard County Library System, is a state-designated special library district. Since Merritt Island is an unincorporated area of Brevard County, in 1965 the area applied for, and was designated, a special library district under Chapter 65-1289 by the Florida Legislature. In 2005, the Florida House of Representatives codified all special acts and amendments, in regards to the Merritt Island Public Library District, under HB 1079.

Infrastructure

Roads 
The residential areas of Merritt Island, East and West Merritt Island, are only accessible by causeway or drawbridge at all points. The island is linked by causeways,  SR 520 (Merritt Island Causeway), State Road 404 (Pineda Causeway), State Road 405, State Road 406, and  SR 528, to the barrier island to its east and the mainland to the west. Mathers Bridge connects the southernmost area to the barrier island.

 SR 3, a 4-lane highway, connects the Kennedy Space Center for workers from the more densely populated central and southern sections of the island.

Sewage 
It became overloaded after Hurricane Irma in 2017. Trucks were used to dispose of the excess which rose to  daily.

Airports 

Merritt Island Airport is a public general aviation airport located on South Merritt Island and run by the Titusville-Cocoa (TICO) Airport Authority.

Landmarks 

 J. R. Field Homestead
 Hacienda del Sol, large historic agricultural estate on South Merritt Island (home still exists, property is now a private estate) 
 Haulover Canal
 Dr. George E. Hill House
 Kennedy Space Center
 Mather's Bridge Restaurant (now closed), previously Hacienda del Sol's workers mess hall, was joined by former field workers quarters (since destroyed) across South Tropical Trail at Mather's Bridge
 Merritt Island Airport
 Merritt Island (Canaveral) Barge Canal
 Merritt Island Dragon
 Merritt Island National Wildlife Refuge
 Kiwanis Island Park
 Merritt Island Rotary Park Nature Trail and Center
 Pine Island Conservation Area,  preserve. Pine Island contains Sams House, built in 1875. It is Brevard's oldest standing structure.
 Old St. Luke's Episcopal Church and Cemetery
 Ulumay Wildlife Sanctuary
 Futch Cove on Banana Creek (location of Apollo/Saturn Visitors Center)
 Merritt Square Mall

Notable people 

 Emory L. Bennett, Medal of Honor recipient; lived in Indianola briefly as a child
 Marco Dawson, professional golfer
 David Max Eichhorn (January 6, 1906 – July 16, 1986) was a Reform Jewish rabbi, author, and a chaplain in the Army. He was among the troops that liberated Dachau. He founded Merritt Island's Temple Israel.
 Tony Gayton, film producer with his brother Joe 
 Clint Hurdle, former manager of the Pittsburgh Pirates and the Colorado Rockies (Major League Baseball) (MLB)
 Zora Neale Hurston, novelist, folklorist, anthropologist 
 Taylor Jordan, professional baseball player
 Mathew Martoma (born 1974 as Ajai Mathew Mariamdani Thomas), hedge fund portfolio manager, convicted of insider trading
 Roy Padrick, Navy journalist and actor, born on Merritt Island
 William H. Peck, college professor, novelist; postmaster for Courtenay
 Adrian Rogers, Southern Baptist pastor and author
 Eric Robert Rudolph, Olympic Park bomber
 Patrick D. Smith, novelist, author of A Land Remembered
 Cecil W. Stoughton, photographer for John F. Kennedy
 Günter Wendt, engineer noted for his work in the U.S. human spaceflight program
 Arias Deukmedjian, racing driver

See also 

 List of Cape Canaveral and Merritt Island launch sites

References 

 
Census-designated places in Brevard County, Florida
Landforms of Brevard County, Florida
Populated places on the Intracoastal Waterway in Florida
Former islands of the United States
Peninsulas of Florida